The Consensus 1982 College Basketball All-American team, as determined by aggregating the results of four major All-American teams. To earn "consensus" status, a player must win honors from a majority of the following teams: the Associated Press, the USBWA, The United Press International and the National Association of Basketball Coaches.

1982 Consensus All-America team

Individual All-America teams

AP Honorable Mention:

Dwight Anderson, Southern California
Mitchell Anderson, Bradley
Doug Arnold, Texas Christian
Bruce Atkins, Duquesne
John Bagley, Boston College
Steve Barker, Samford
Jerry Beck, Middle Tennessee
Boot Bond, Pepperdine
Randy Breuer, Minnesota
Wallace Bryant, San Francisco
Steve Burtt, Iona
Antoine Carr, Wichita State
Ronnie Carr, Western Carolina
Dan Caldwell, Washington
Howard Carter, Louisiana State
Riley Clarida, Long Island
Carlos Clark, Mississippi
Albert Culton, Texas–Arlington
Clarence Dickerson, Hawaii
Skip Dillard, DePaul
Joe Dumars, McNeese State
Bill Dunlap, Gonzaga
Keith Edmonson, Purdue
Patrick Ewing, Georgetown
Kenny Fields, UCLA
Jimmy Foster, South Carolina
Bill Garnett, Wyoming
Stewart Granger, Villanova
Butch Graves, Yale
Ken Green, Nevada-Reno
Sidney Green, UNLV
Mike Hackett, Jacksonville
Chipper Harris, Robert Morris
Scott Hastings, Arkansas
Granger Hall, Temple
Rod Higgins, Fresno State
Roy Hinson, Rutgers
Derrick Hord, Kentucky
Joe Jakubick, Akron
Greg Jones, West Virginia
Mark Jones, St. Bonaventure
Clark Kellogg, Ohio State
Harry Kelly, Texas Southern
Ted Kitchel, Indiana
Brad Leaf, Evansville
Lafayette Lever, Arizona State
Cliff Levingston, Wichita State
Paul Little, Pennsylvania
Kenneth Lyons, North Texas State
David Maxwell, Fordham
Mark McNamara, California
Jack Moore, Nebraska
Perry Moss, Northeastern
Ed Nealy, Kansas State
Mark Nickens, American
Ken Owens, Idaho
John Paxson, Notre Dame
Sam Perkins, North Carolina
Eddie Phillips, Alabama
John Pinone, Villanova
Allen Rayhorn, Northern Illinois
John Revelli, Stanford
Fred Roberts, Brigham Young
Oliver Robinson, Alabama-Birmingham
David Russell, St. John's
Walker Russell, Western Michigan
Mike Sanders, UCLA
Erich Santifer, Syracuse
Wayne Sappleton, Loyola (IL)
John Schweitz, Richmond
Charlie Sitton, Oregon State
Jose Slaughter, Portland
Derek Smith, Louisville
Kevin Smith, Michigan State
Steve Smith, Marist
Dale Solomon, Virginia Tech
Brook Steppe, Georgia Tech
Steve Stipanovich, Missouri
Jon Sundvold, Missouri
Vince Taylor, Duke
Corny Thompson, Connecticut
LaSalle Thompson, Texas
Linton Townes, James Madison
Alford Turner, Southwestern Louisiana
David Vann, Saint Mary's
Matt Waldron, Pacific
Phil Ward, UNC Charlotte
Bryan Warrick, St. Joseph's
Mark West, Old Dominion
Terry White, Texas-El Paso
Willie White, Tennessee-Chattanooga
Mitchell Wiggins, Florida State
Rob Williams, Houston
Ronnie Williams, Florida
Mike Wilson, Marquette
Othell Wilson, Virginia
Leon Wood, Cal State Fullerton
Carlos Yates, George Mason

References

NCAA Men's Basketball All-Americans
All-Americans